Rochefort-en-Terre is a commune in the Morbihan department of Brittany in north-western France.

Rochefort-en-Terre is a designated "Petite Cité de Caractère" and one of Les Plus Beaux Villages de France.

The medieval chateau in the town was the home of American painter Alfred Klots. He purchased the chateau in the early 1900s and oversaw its restoration. His son Trafford Klots inherited the chateau and continued to paint there and entertain other visiting artists. After his death his wife donated the building to the French government. In the grounds of the building is the NAIA museum, named after an early twentieth century witch who lived in the town. It houses a small collection of fantasy and kinetic art and sculpture.

Demographics

Inhabitants of Rochefort-en-Terre are called in French Rochefortais.

See also
Communes of the Morbihan department
Henri Gouzien Sculptor of Rochefort-en-Terre War Memorial

References

External links

Official website 

 Mayors of Morbihan Association 

Communes of Morbihan
Plus Beaux Villages de France
Morbihan communes articles needing translation from French Wikipedia